Arve Kambe (born 25 November 1974) is a Norwegian politician (H). He was elected to the Stortinget from Rogaland in 2009. He has a cand.mag. in law, as well as having studied history and comparative politics. He has worked as business chief at Trygge Barnehager.

He was city council deputy in Haugesund 1995–2009, council member 2001, and group leader since 2003. He was also county council member from 1999 to 2003. Kambe was deputy leader of Unge Høyre from 1998 to 2000. In 2009 he was Rogaland Høyre's 3rd candidate for the Stortinget, and was elected, along with Bent Høie and Siri A. Meling.

Storting committees 
 2009–2013 member of Finance Committee

External links 
 Arve Kambe at Stortinget
 Arve Kambe at Rogaland Høyre
 Arve Kambe at TV 2

People from Haugesund
1974 births
Living people
Members of the Storting
21st-century Norwegian politicians